Pranayavarnangal (Colors of Love) is a Malayalam  romantic film released in 1998. Directed by Sibi Malayil, the script was written by Jayaraman Kadambaat and Sachithanandan Puzhankara. Suresh Gopi, Manju Warrier, Divya Unni and Biju Menon appeared in leading roles.

Plot
Arathy is a shy girl, who is silent, day-dreamer and loves poetry whereas Maya is her roommate and best friend who is naughty and plays pranks on hostel mates. Victor loves Aarathy, but is afraid to express his love. In an college event, Vinayachandran who is well known to Maya's family and deputy collector of the city comes as the guest and he praises Aarathy on listening to her poetry. Meanwhile, Maya realizes that Aarathy has a crush on Vinayan. Seeing this as an opportunity to make Aarathy come out of her shell, Maya compels her friend to write letters to Aarathy posing as Vinayan. Aarathy truly falls in love with Vinayan, whereas he doesn't have a clue about this. Meanwhile, Maya's parents arranges her marriage with Vinayan as he is in love with Maya. Maya also starts loving Vinayan. Soon Maya forces Aarathy to forget Vinayan as she feels guilty and both the friends break up. With the help of Victor, Aarathy comes to meet Vinayan, but realizes that he is marrying Maya. Aarathy has a mental breakdown. Victor takes care of her. Vinayan visits her and tells her the truth and both the friends reunite.

Cast

Soundtrack

The soundtrack of the film was composed by Vidyasagar to the lyrics written by Gireesh Puthenchery and Sachidanandan Puzhankara, co-writer of the film. The songs are popular among the masses. The song "Aaro Viral" was shot at University College Thiruvananthapuram.  The song "Kannadi Koodum" tune was reused by Vidyasagar as "Toonega Toonega" in 2001 Telugu movie Manasantha Nuvve directed by V. N. Aditya. It was then reused in Tamil, Kannada and Bengali remakes of Manasantha Nuvve.

Track listing

Awards
 Kerala State Film Award for Best Music Director - Vidyasagar
 Kerala State Film Award for Best Female Playback Singer - Sujatha Mohan
 Kerala Film Critics Award for Best Music Director - Vidyasagar
Kerala Film Critics Award for Best Female Playback Singer - Sujatha Mohan
 Asianet Film Award for Best Music Director - Vidyasagar
 Asianet Film Award for Best Female Playback Singer - Sujatha Mohan

References

1998 films
1990s Malayalam-language films
Films directed by Sibi Malayil
Films scored by Vidyasagar